The Gibson EB-2 is an electric bass guitar model produced by the Gibson Guitar Corporation from 1958 to 1972, with a hiatus from 1962 to 1963. When production ceased in 1972, a total of 8017 instruments had been built, with 2102 of them being EB-2D's. Willie Moseley, in Vintage Guitar, referred to the bass guitar as possibly "Gibson's biggest bass invention", although it was not a great commercial success, and the Epiphone Rivoli branded version of the model may have sold more copies than the Gibson branded one.

Description
Introduced in 1958, the EB-2 was the bass guitar equivalent of the popular Gibson ES-335. It featured a 335-style semi-hollow body, a short 30.5" scale neck and one large "Sidewinder" humbucking pickup in the neck position. The electronics consisted of a single volume and tone knob. The EB-2N had natural finish, the EB-2 sunburst. The next year a "Baritone switch" was added, which  enhanced or cut the bass frequencies, and later a string mute was added to the bridge. By 1961 the original banjo-style tuners (with the pegs pointing backwards) were replaced by regular tuners, and by 1965 cherry was a color option also.

In 1966, the EB-2D was introduced, which added a mini-humbucker pickup in the bridge position (like the EB-3). Electronics included separate volume and tone controls and a 3-way switch to select the pickups, besides the "baritone" switch.

Variants
In 2012 Gibson came out with a "Midtown Standard" bass, a semi-hollow bass loosely based on the EB-2D. Although cosmetically very alike, it supports a long-scale 34" neck, a solid mahogany body with routed tonechambers and a flat maple top, which is considerably smaller than the original 335-shape (somewhere between an ES-335 and a Les Paul shape) and different electronics.

References

EB-2